Bovina Independent School District is a public school district based in Bovina, Texas, United States. The district operates one high school, Bovina High School.

Finances
As of the 2010–2011 school year, the appraised valuation of property in the district was $70,499,000. The maintenance tax rate was $0.102 and the bond tax rate was $0.000 per $100 of appraised valuation.

Academic achievement
In 2011, the school district was rated "academically acceptable" by the Texas Education Agency. 49% of districts in Texas in 2011 received the same rating. No state accountability ratings will be given to districts in 2012. A school district in Texas can receive one of four possible rankings from the Texas Education Agency: Exemplary (the highest possible ranking), Recognized, Academically Acceptable, and Academically Unacceptable (the lowest possible ranking).

Historical district TEA accountability ratings
2011: Academically Acceptable
2010: Recognized
2009: Academically Acceptable
2008: Academically Acceptable
2007: Academically Acceptable
2006: Academically Acceptable
2005: Academically Acceptable
2004: Academically Acceptable

Schools
In the 2011–2012 school year, the district operated three campuses.
Bovina High (grades 9-12)
Bovina Middle (grades 6-8)
Bovina Elementary (grades PK-5)

Athletics
Bovina High School participates in the boys' sports of basketball, cross country, golf, track and football and the girls' sports of cross country, basketball, track and golf. For the 2012 through 2014 school years, Bovina High School played football in UIL Class 1A Division II.

See also

List of school districts in Texas
List of high schools in Texas

References

External links
 Bovina ISD

School districts in Parmer County, Texas